David or Dave Wohl is the name of:
David A. Wohl, American infectious disease physician
Dave Wohl (born 1949), American basketball player and coach.
David Wohl, American comic book author and editor.
David Wohl (actor) (born 1953), American actor